Martynovskaya is a rural locality (a village) in Nizhne-Vazhskoye Rural Settlement, Verkhovazhsky District, Vologda Oblast, Russia. The population was 16 as of 2002.

Geography 
Martynovskaya is located 11 km northeast of Verkhovazhye (the district's administrative centre) by road. Petrovskaya is the nearest rural locality.

References 

Rural localities in Verkhovazhsky District